Mohammad Sadiq Kaboudvand (born on 23 March 1963) is an Iranian Kurdish activist and journalist born in Divandarreh. He was the editor of Payam-e Mardom. He is also the founder of Kurdistan Human Rights Organization (Rêxistina Mafê Mirovan li Kurdistanê in Kurdish). Founded in 2005, the organization is a politically and religiously independent body. It has offices in Tehran and Kurdistan province.

According to International Campaign for Human Rights in Iran, he has been in custody since June 2007, and is serving an 11-year prison term.  Kaboudvand was kept in solitary confinement for 5 months in Evin Prison’s Sections 209 and 240.  The Kurdish Human Rights Project has reported that he is being held "without adequate medical care despite reportedly suffering from serious health problems."  In April 2008, he suffered a stroke and was taken to a specialist to receive treatment. In October, 2008, his 11-year prison sentence was upheld by an Iranian appeals court.

Kaboudavand documented and reported on human rights violations in Iran’s Kurdish areas, from April 9, 2005, when he established HROK, until the time of his arrest.  Charges he was convicted of are “acting against national security through founding of HROK,” “widespread propaganda against the state by disseminating news,” “opposing Islamic penal laws by publicizing punishments such as stoning and executions,” and “advocating on behalf of political prisoners.”

Kaboudavand was a highlighted writer for the 2008 observances of the Day of the Imprisoned Writer. Amnesty International designated him a prisoner of conscience, "held solely for his human rights work and the peaceful expression of his views".

In January 2012, Kaboudavand's son Pejman became seriously ill with an undiagnosed kidney condition. Despite repeated requests, Kaboudavand was allowed only one two-hour visit to his son's hospital room in February. On 26 May 2012, Kaboudavand began a hunger strike to protest the refusal of authorities to allow him to visit Pejman more regularly. As of 11 July, the hunger strike had lasted nearly two months, raising concerns for his health.

References 

Amnesty International prisoners of conscience held by Iran
Iranian activists
Iranian journalists
Living people
Kurdish journalists
Iranian prisoners and detainees
People convicted of spreading propaganda against the system by the Islamic Republic of Iran
People convicted of action against national security by the Islamic Republic of Iran
1963 births